White Bermudians or Bermudians of European descent, are Bermudians whose ancestry lies within the continent of Europe, most notably the British Isles and Portugal. According to the 2016 census Bermudian's who identify as white was 19,466 or 31 percent.

History

The first Europeans to discover Bermuda were Spanish explorers. Spanish explorer Juan de Bermúdez discovered the island in the early 1500s. The White population of Bermuda made up the entirety of the Bermuda's population, other than a black and an Indian slave brought in for a very short-lived pearl fishery in 1616, from settlement (which began accidentally in 1609 with the wreck of the Sea Venture) until the middle of the 17th century, and the majority until some point in the 18th century.

Early settlement
The majority of the first European settlers arrived from England as indentured servants or tenant farmers, as most of Bermuda's land was owned by absentee landlords who remained in England as shareholders (adventurers) in the Virginia Company and then its offshoot the Somers Isles Company. Later Irish Gaels were sent to Bermuda after the Cromwellian conquest of Ireland that followed the English Civil War. Usually described as 'prisoners-of-war', these Irish men and women were removed from Ireland involuntarily, and sold into indentured servitude on arrival in Bermuda. A small number of Scots were sent to Bermuda in the same way after Cromwell's invasion of Scotland. The Irish were ostracised by the English, and were found so troublesome that their further import was banned. By the middle of the 18th century, they, and the Native American slaves also sent to Bermuda after the conquest of their homelands, had largely merged, with the free and enslaved blacks (most of whom came from Spanish, or formerly Spanish, colonies in the West Indies), with Bermuda's population boiled down to two demographic groups: White and Coloured.

Population count
The population of Bermuda on 17 April 1721, was listed as 8,364, composed of: "Totals:—Men on the Muster roll, 1,078; men otherwise, 91; Women, 1,596; boys, 1,072; girls, 1,013. Blacks; Men, 817, women 965; boys 880; girls, 852."

The Population of Bermuda in 1727 included 4,470 whites (910 men; 1,261 boys; 1,168 women; 1,131 girls) and 3,877 coloured (787 men; 1,158 boys; 945 women; 987 girls).

By 1871 the permanent population (not including the thousands of sailors and soldiers stationed in the colony) included 4,725 whites (2,118 males; 2,607 females) and 7,376 coloured (3,284 males and 4,112 females).

The term coloured was generally used in preference to black as anyone who was of wholly European ancestry (at least Northern European) was defined as white, leaving everyone else as coloured. This included the multi-racial descendants of the previous minority demographic groups (Black, Irish and Native American), as well as the occasional Jew, Persian, South-Asian, East Asian or other non-White and non-Black Bermudian.

It was largely by this method (mixed-race Bermudians being added to the number of Blacks, rather than added to the number of Whites or being defined as a separate demographic group) that coloured (subsequently redefined after the Second World War as black) Bermudians came to outnumber white Bermudians, despite both starting off at a numerical disadvantage and low Black immigration prior to the latter 19th century. Other contributing factors included the scale of white relative to black emigration in the 17th and 18th centuries, the greater mortality of whites from disease in the late 17th century, and large-scale West Indian immigration, which began, like Portuguese immigration, in the 19th century to provide labourers for the new export agriculture industry and expansion of the Royal Naval Dockyard. The Black West Indians, unlike the Portuguese, were British citizens and not obliged to leave Bermuda, as many Portuguese were, at the end of a contracted period.

20th century
At some point after the Second World War, the practice became for those with any degree of sub-Saharan African ancestry (which was virtually everyone who had been defined as coloured) to be defined as black, with Asian and other non-white Bermudians defined as separate racial groups (although it also, in that century, ceased to be the practice to record race on birth or other records). On census returns, only in recent years have Bermudians been given the option to define themselves by more than one race, although there was considerable opposition to this from many Black leaders who discouraged Black Bermudians from doing so.

Ancestral origins

The majority of Bermuda's overall ancestry actually remains European, as most black Bermudians are actually of European ancestry, but as only those entirely of European ancestry are considered white, the largest demographic group is black, despite those of entirely sub-Saharan African ancestry being only a negligible part of the population.

This history has been well understood from the written record, was confirmed in 2009 by the only genetic survey of Bermuda, which looked exclusively at the black population of St. David's Island (as the purpose of the study was to seek Native American haplogroups, which could be assumed to be absent from the white population) consequently showed that the African ancestry of black Bermudians (other than those resulting from recent immigration from the British West Indian islands) is largely from a band across southern Africa, from Angola to Mozambique, which is similar to what is revealed in Latin America, but distinctly different from the blacks of the British West Indies and the United States.

68% of the mtDNA (maternal) lineages of the black islanders were found to be African, with the two most common being L0a and L3e, which are sourced from populations spread from Central-West to South-East Africa. These lineages represent less than 5% of the mtDNA lineages of blacks in the United States and the English-speaking West Indies. They are, however, common in Brazil and the Spanish-speaking countries of Latin America. L3e, by example, is typical of !Kung speaking populations of the Kalahari, as well as of parts of Mozambique and Nigeria. The modern nation where it represents the highest percentage of the population is actually Brazil, where it represents 21% of mtDNA lineages. 31% of the mtDNA lineages of blacks in Bermuda are West Eurasian (European), with J1c being the most common. 1% were Native American. For NRY (paternal) haplogroups among black Bermudians, the study found about a third were made up of three African ones (of which E1b1a, the most common NRY haplogroup in West and Central African populations, "accounted for the vast majority of the African NRY samples (83%)" ), with the remainder (about 64.79%) being West Eurasian excepting one individual (1.88%) with a Native American NRY haplogroup Q1a3a. Of the individuals with European NRY haplogroups, more than half had R1b1b2, which is common in Europe and is found at frequencies over 75% in England and Wales.

Present
The 2010 Bermudian census found that White Bermudians accounted for 31% of the territory's total population, with a further 7% of Bermuda's population self-identifying as being of mixed African and European descent.

Birthplace
A majority of Bermudians classified as white are foreign-born nationals. 
The most common place of birth for them are: 
 United Kingdom: 3,942 (or 6% of Bermuda's total population)
 United States: 3,424 (6%) 
 Canada: 2,235 (4%)
 Azores/Portugal: 1,574 (3%) 
 Other European countries: 1,125 (2%).

See also

British Overseas Territories
Bahamians
Spaniards
White Caribbeans
British people
White people

References

Bermudian
 
Ethnic groups in Bermuda
White North American